The Resterberg is a compilation album of recordings by Paul Westerberg, released in 2005. It contains alternate mixes, single versions, and a previously unreleased track.

Track listing
All songs by Paul Westerberg.
"Dyslexic Heart		  
"Seein' Her"	  
"Man Without Ties"	  
"A Star Is Bored"	  
"Stain Yer Blood"	  
"Once Around the Weekend"
"All That I Had"	  
"C'mon, C'mon, C'mon"

External links
[ Allmusic entry.]

Paul Westerberg albums
2005 compilation albums
Rhino Records compilation albums